This article contains information about the literary events and publications of 1894.

Events
February – Oscar Wilde's play Salome is first published in English, with illustrations by Aubrey Beardsley.
February 15 – French anarchist Martial Bourdin accidentally kills himself while attempting to plant a bomb at the Royal Observatory, Greenwich, a fictionalised version of which appears in Joseph Conrad's novel The Secret Agent (1907).
Early Spring – Mary Antin emigrates from White Russia (Belarus) to the United States with her mother.
April – The Yellow Book imprint, edited by Henry Harland, begins publication by John Lane and Elkin Mathews – The Bodley Head – in London.
April 21 – George Bernard Shaw's play Arms and the Man is premièred at the Avenue Theatre in London.
May – The Scottish writer William Sharp publishes Pharais, his first novel under the pseudonym Fiona MacLeod.
June – The German novelist Hermann Hesse begins an apprenticeship in mechanical engineering at a factory in Calw.
August 15 – A. E. Waite starts to publish and edit an occult periodical, The Unknown World.
October – Lafcadio Hearn begins work as a journalist for the English-language Kobe Chronicle in Japan.
November 8 – Robert Frost's first poem, "My Butterfly" appears in The New York Independent, which pays him $15.
December
An abridgement of Stephen Crane's American Civil War novel The Red Badge of Courage is first published as a serial in The Philadelphia Press.
Arthur Conan Doyle publishes "An Alpine Pass on "Ski"" in The Strand Magazine (London), popularizing skiing as a sport in Switzerland.
December 22 – Claude Debussy's symphonic poem Prélude à l'après-midi d'un faune, a free interpretation of Stéphane Mallarmé's 1876 poem, "L'Après-midi d'un faune", is premièred in Paris.
unknown dates
The U.K. circulating libraries of Mudie's and WHSmith cease to purchase three-volume novels, killing off the format.
J. M. Dent begins in London to publish Temple Shakespeare pocket editions, edited by Israel Gollancz.
The Century Roman typeface, first of the Century type family, is cut by American Type Founders' designer Linn Boyd Benton, originally for Theodore Low De Vinne's The Century Magazine.

New books

Fiction
Gabriele D'Annunzio – Il trionfo della morte (The Triumph of Death)
Clementina Black – The Agitator
Léon Bloy – Disagreeable Tales
Mary Elizabeth Braddon – The Christmas Hirelings
Walter Browne – 2894
Hall Caine 
The Madhi: or Love and Race, A Drama in Story
The Manxman
Anton Chekhov – "The Student" («Студент», published in Russkiye Vedomosti, April)
Kate Chopin
Bayou Folk
"The Story of an Hour"
Ella Hepworth Dixon – The Story of a Modern Woman
Arthur Conan Doyle – The Memoirs of Sherlock Holmes (collection)
George du Maurier – Trilby (serialization in Harper's Monthly Magazine)
Marcellus Emants – Een Nagelaten Bekentenis (A Posthumous Confession)
Theodor Fontane – Effi Briest (begins serialization in Deutsche Rundschau)
Mary E. Wilkins Freeman – Pembroke
George Gissing – In the Year of Jubilee
Katharine Glasier (as Katharine Conway) – Husband & Brother, a few chapters in a woman's life of to-day
H. Rider Haggard – The People of the Mist
Knut Hamsun – Pan
Robert Hichens – The Green Carnation
William Dean Howells – A Traveler from Altruria
Jerome K. Jerome – John Ingerfield: And Other Stories
Sheridan Le Fanu – The Watcher and Other Weird Stories
 Juhan Liiv – "Vari" ("The Shadow")
Arthur Machen – The Great God Pan (in book form, with "The Innermost Light")
Ian Maclaren – Beside the Bonnie Brier Bush
George A. Moore – Esther Waters
William Morris – The Wood Beyond the World
Arthur Morrison – Martin Hewitt: Investigator
John Muir – The Mountains of California
Gustavus W. Pope – Journey to Mars
Bolesław Prus – The New Woman (Emancypantki; book publication)
Jules Renard – Poil de carotte (Carrot Head)
Solomon Schindler – Young West
Flora Annie Steel
The Flower of Forgiveness
The Potter's Thumb
Tales of the Punjab (short stories)
Stendhal – Lucien Leuwen
Hermann Sudermann – The Undying Past (Es war)
Robert Louis Stevenson and Lloyd Osbourne – The Ebb-Tide
Mark Twain 
Pudd'nhead Wilson
Tom Sawyer Abroad
Jules Verne – Captain Antifer
Mary Augusta Ward – Marcella
H. G. Wells – "The Red Room"
Israel Zangwill – The Bachelors' Club
Émile Zola – Lourdes

Children and young people
Harold Avery
The Orderly Officer
The School's Honour
R. D. Blackmore – Perlycross
Anthony Hope
The Dolly Dialogues
The Prisoner of Zenda
Rudyard Kipling – The Jungle Book
E. Nesbit – Miss Mischief
Talbot Baines Reed – Tom, Dick and Harry
Margaret Marshall Saunders – Beautiful Joe
Ethel Turner – Seven Little Australians

Drama
Hall Caine – The Manxman ("Pete" version)
William Gillette – Too Much Johnson (adapted from Maurice Ordonneau's La Plantation Thomassin)
Martin Greif – Agnes Bernauer, der Engel von Augsburg
Sydney Grundy 
A Bunch of Violets
An Old Jew
Henry Arthur Jones – The Case of Rebellious Susan
Josef Lauff – Ignez de Castro
Maurice Maeterlinck – The Death of Tintagiles (La Mort de Tintagiles, for marionette performance)
Marc-André Raffalovich and John Gray – The Blackmailers
Victorien Sardou – Gismonda
George Bernard Shaw – Arms and the Man

Poetry
Bliss Carman – Low Tide on Grande Pre: A Book Of Lyrics
Pierre Louÿs – Songs of Bilitis
Rainer Maria Rilke – Leben und Lieder

Non-fiction
John Bartlett (comp.) – A Complete Concordance or verbal index to words, phrases and passages in the dramatic Works of Shakespeare
Edward Carpenter – Homogenic Love and Its Place in a Free Society
Christabel Rose Coleridge – The Daughters Who Have not Revolted (essays)
Francis Darwin (with E. H. Acton) – The Practical Physiology of Plants
King Gillette – The Human Drift
Karl Marx – Das Kapital
Leo Tolstoy – The Kingdom of God Is Within You («Царство Божіе внутри васъ», Tsárstvo Bózhiye vnutrí vas)

Births
January 1 – Aurora Nilsson, Swedish writer (died 1972)
January 22 – Charles Langbridge Morgan, English novelist and dramatist (died 1958)
February 6 – Eric Partridge, New Zealand/British lexicographer (died 1979)
March 14 – Nichita Smochină, Transnistrian Romanian ethnographer and journalist (died 1980)
March 17 – Paul Green, American novelist and Pulitzer Prize winning playwright (died 1981)
March 23 – Mark Slonim, Russian literary historian and critic (died 1976)
April 6 – Elinor M. Brent-Dyer, English children's writer (died 1969)
April 7 – A. A. Thomson, English cricket and travel writer (died 1968)
May 1 – Elizabeth Johanna Bosman, South African author who wrote under the pen name Marie Linde (d. 1963)
May 27
Louis-Ferdinand Céline, French novelist and pamphleteer (died 1961)
Dashiell Hammett, American detective fiction writer (died 1961)
June 14 – W. W. E. Ross, Canadian geophysicist and Imagist poet (died 1966)
June 15 – Trygve Gulbranssen, Norwegian novelist, businessman and journalist (died 1962)
June 28 – Allardyce Nicoll, British literary scholar (died 1976)
July 8 – Claude-Henri Grignon, Canadian novelist, journalist and politician (died 1976)
July 9 – Phelps Putnam, American poet (died 1948)
July 18 – Isaac Babel, Ukrainian writer (died 1940)
July 26 – Aldous Huxley, English novelist and poet (died 1963)
July 30 – Păstorel Teodoreanu, Romanian poet and satirist (died 1964)
August 31 – Albert Facey, Australian autobiographer (died 1982)
September 6 – Howard Pease, American maritime adventure novelist (died 1974)
September 19 – Rachel Field, American author and poet (died 1942)
September 23 – Momčilo Nastasijević, Serbian poet, novelist and dramatist (died 1938)
October 4 – Frans G. Bengtsson, Swedish novelist, essayist, poet and biographer (died 1954)
October 9 – Agnes von Krusenstjerna, Swedish writer (died 1940)
October 14 – E. E. Cummings, American poet (died 1962)
October 18 – H. L. Davis, American fiction writer, Pulitzer Prize winning novelist and poet (died 1960)
October 26 – Eugene Jolas, American writer, literary translator and critic (died 1952)
December 8 – James Thurber, American cartoonist and humorous writer (died 1961)
December 26
Håkon Evjenth, Norwegian children's writer (died 1951)
Jean Toomer (Nathan Eugene Pinchback Toomer), African American writer (died 1967)
December 31 – Hong Shen (洪深), Chinese dramatist (died 1955)

Deaths
January 7 – Sophia Alice Callahan, American Muscogee novelist and teacher (born 1868)
February 8 – R. M. Ballantyne, Scottish novelist for youth (born 1825)
April 8
Bankim Chandra Chatterjee, Bengali writer and poet (born 1838)
Harriet Anne Scott, Scottish novelist (born 1819)
April 12 – Ludwig Pfau, German poet, journalist, and revolutionary (born 1821)
April 14 – Adolf Friedrich von Schack, German poet, literary historian and art collector (born 1815)
April 29 – Augusta Theodosia Drane, English religious writer and biographer (born 1823)
May 6 – Fanny Murdaugh Downing, American author and poet (born 1831)
May 7 
 Frances Elizabeth Barrow, American juvenile literature author (born 1822)
 Marie Sophie Schwartz, Swedish novelist (born 1819)
May 19 – Caroline M. Sawyer, American poet, writer, and editor (born 1812)
May 20 – Edmund Yates, Scottish novelist and dramatist (born 1831)
June 5 – Edward Capern, English poet (born 1819)
July 30 – Walter Pater, English essayist, critic and novelist (born 1839)
August 6 – Otto Müller, German novelist (born 1816)
August 10 – Cynthia Roberts Gorton, American poet and author (born 1826)
August 25 – Celia Laighton Thaxter, American author (born 1835)
October 8 – Oliver Wendell Holmes, American poet and physician (born 1809)
October 20 – James Anthony Froude, English historian, novelist and biographer (born 1818)
December 3 – Robert Louis Stevenson, Scottish novelist, poet and travel writer (born 1850)
December 9 – Mary Bell Smith, American writer, educator, social reformer (born 1818)
December 29 – Christina Rossetti, English poet (born 1830)
Unknown dates 
Giuseppe Borrello, Sicilian poet (born 1820)
Nabagopal Mitra, Indian playwright, poet and essayist (born c. 1840)

Awards
Newdigate Prize – Frank Taylor

References

External link

 
Years of the 19th century in literature